Mitchelstown Cave (also known as New Cave) is a limestone cave near Burncourt, County Tipperary, Ireland. Situated  from Mitchelstown, County Cork, it became the first cave in Ireland to be developed for the public in 1972.

It is a privately owned local landmark and tourist destination, with a number of caverns open to the public through a guided tour. Noteworthy speleothems include the Tower of Babel column. The largest cavern, known as the Tír na Nóg has hosted musical events including a performance by the Celtic Tenors.

History 
While the presence of a nearby cave (referred to variously as Old Cave, Old Mitchelstown Cave or Desmond Cave) has been known in the area at least as far back as 1777, Mitchelstown Cave aka "New Cave" was discovered accidentally by Laura Condon, a farm worker on 3 May 1833. The Mitchelstown Caves are so called, in spite of their distance from Mitchelstown, due to their location on the old Kingston estate. The lord of the estate, Lord Kingsborough, had his seat in Mitchelstown Castle.

Mitchelstown Cave was first explored and mapped in 1834 by James Apjohn, and subsequently visited by a large number of eminent naturalists and speleologists. In August 1857 Alexander Henry Haliday visited with Edward Percival Wright and recorded a number of animal species present. Members of the Dublin, Cork and Limerick Naturalist Field Clubs took part in a trip to the cave in July 1894 and also reported on the fauna found within. In 1895, Édouard-Alfred Martel and H. Lyster Jameson visited and completed a new cave survey.

In 1908 the cave was thoroughly explored and resurveyed again by Dr C. A. Hill, Dr A. Rule and Harold Brodrick of the Yorkshire Ramblers' Club, along with Robert Lloyd Praeger. A survey of Old Cave was also completed at this time.

Jackie English decided to make the cave more accessible to the public by putting in electricity and steps, this work was completed in 1972. It took 7 years to complete this work and the footprints of the two main workers can still be seen at the foot of the Tower of Babel.  Prior to this work all visitors had to enter the cave using Tilly lamps and a rope ladder.

References

Further reading

External links 
 Mitchelstown Cave – Official Web Site

Limestone caves
Mitchelstown
Show caves in the Republic of Ireland
Tourist attractions in County Tipperary